In mathematics, a quasi-Frobenius Lie algebra 

 

over a field  is a Lie algebra 
 

equipped with a nondegenerate skew-symmetric bilinear form 

In other words,

If  is a coboundary, which means that there exists a linear form  such that

then
 
is called a Frobenius Lie algebra.

Equivalence with pre-Lie algebras with nondegenerate invariant skew-symmetric bilinear form 
If  is a quasi-Frobenius Lie algebra, one can define on  another bilinear product  by the formula
.

Then one has
 and 
 
is a pre-Lie algebra.

See also
Lie coalgebra
Lie bialgebra
Lie algebra cohomology
Frobenius algebra
Quasi-Frobenius ring

References
 Jacobson, Nathan, Lie algebras, Republication of the 1962 original. Dover Publications, Inc., New York, 1979.   
 Vyjayanthi Chari and Andrew Pressley, A Guide to Quantum Groups, (1994), Cambridge University Press, Cambridge .

Lie algebras
Coalgebras
Symplectic topology